This list of museums in Essex, England contains museums which are defined for this context as institutions (including nonprofit organizations, government entities, and private businesses) that collect and care for objects of cultural, artistic, scientific, or historical interest and make their collections or related exhibits available for public viewing. Also included are non-profit art galleries and university art galleries.  Museums that exist only in cyberspace (i.e., virtual museums) are not included.

Museums

Defunct museums
 Motorboat Museum, Basildon; closed December 2009
 Southend Historic Aircraft Museum, Southend-on-Sea; closed May, 1983 [2]
 Tymperleys Clock Museum, Colchester, closed in 2010, clocks now at Hollytrees Museum
 Walton Hall Museum, Stanford-le-Hope, closed in 2010

References

 Museums in Essex

See also
 Visitor attractions in Essex

 
Essex
Museums